The Washington State Institute for Public Policy, a creation of the state legislature of the U.S. state of Washington, researches public policy issues of interest to the legislature and state agencies, in association with The Evergreen State College. It was created in 1983 and currently supports public access to various reports and projects occurring in the state. Many of these reports are created to provide data for policy makers of the state.

Board of directors
As of February 2013, the board of directors consists of the following 16 members. Their responsibilities include appointing institute directors, providing reviews, and performing overarching oversight for all institute projects.

Areas of focus
The Washington State Institute for Public Policy has a majority of research on the following topics:

 Child welfare
 Criminal justice
 Education
 Health care
 Mental health
 Prevention
 Government
 State economy
 Cost–Benefit Analysis 
 Research-Based Programs

External links
Official home page

Notes

Institute for Public Policy